Gibbulinopsis is a genus of gastropods belonging to the family Pupillidae.

The species of this genus are found in Asia, Africa, Australia.

Species:

Gibbulinopsis cryptodon 
Gibbulinopsis fontana 
Gibbulinopsis gracilis 
Gibbulinopsis interrupta 
Gibbulinopsis nanosignata 
Gibbulinopsis pupula 
Gibbulinopsis rahti 
Gibbulinopsis signata 
Gibbulinopsis submuscorum

References

Gastropods